This is a list of the United States Congresses, including their beginnings, endings, and the dates of their sessions. Each Congress lasts for two years and begins on January 3 of odd years.

Before the Twentieth Amendment to the United States Constitution, which fixed Congressional dates, the dates on which a Congress ended was either March 3 or March 4.

List of previous Congresses

Current Congress

Next Congress

See also
 History of the United States Senate
 Party divisions of United States Congresses
 Timeline of Washington, D.C.

External links
 
 
 
 

 
Congresses
Congresses